TRAPPIST-1h, also designated as 2MASS J23062928-0502285 h, is an exoplanet orbiting around the ultra-cool dwarf star TRAPPIST-1 39 light-years (12 parsecs) away from Earth in the constellation Aquarius. It was one of four new exoplanets to be discovered orbiting the star using observations from the Spitzer Space Telescope. Throughout 2017 and 2018, more studies were able to refine its physical parameters.

The outermost known planet in its system, it is roughly one third the mass of Earth, and about 77% as large. Its relatively low density indicates that it is likely water-rich, like several other planets in the system.

Physical characteristics

Mass, radius, and temperature 
TRAPPIST-1h has a radius of 0.773 , a mass of 0.331 , and about 56% Earth's surface gravity. It has a density of 3.97 g/cm3, extremely similar to that of Mars. Given this density, about ≤5% of its mass must be water, likely in the form of a thick ice shell, seeing as it only receives about 13% of the stellar flux that Earth does. It has an equilibrium temperature of 169 K (−104 °C; −155 °F), similar to that of Earth's south pole.

Host star 
TRAPPIST-1h orbits the ultracool dwarf star TRAPPIST-1. It is 0.121  and 0.089 , with a temperature of 2511 K and an age between 3 and 8 billion years. For comparison, the Sun has a temperature of 5778 K and is about 4.5 billion years old. TRAPPIST-1 is also very dim, with about 0.0005 times the luminosity of the Sun. The star's apparent magnitude, or how bright it appears from Earth's perspective, is 18.8. Therefore, it is too dim to be seen with the naked eye.

Orbit 
Despite it being the most distant known planet in its system, TRAPPIST-1h orbits its host star with an orbital period of 18.868 days and an orbital radius of about 0.0619 AU. This is even smaller than Mercury's orbit around the Sun (which is about 0.38 AU).

Stable liquid water 
Although TRAPPIST-1h's orbit falls near its star's frost line, it could harbor liquid water under an H2-rich atmosphere, either primordial or resulting from continuous outgassing combined with internal heating, although existence of such atmosphere was strongly disfavored by observations in 2021 and 2022. It could also potentially harbor a subsurface ocean by way of tidal heating, which could lead to cryovolcanism in the form of erupting geysers.

See also
 List of transiting exoplanets

References

Exoplanets discovered in 2017
Near-Earth-sized exoplanets
Transiting exoplanets
TRAPPIST-1
Aquarius (constellation)